Yousuf Yaqoob al-Serkal is a football official from the United Arab Emirates. He is a former vice-president of the Asian Football Confederation (2011–2015). He served as the Chairman of the United Arab Emirates Football Association for two terms, (2004 to 2008) and (2011 to 2016), then he became the president of UAE General Sports Authority in 2017.

References

Living people
Association football executives
Asian Football Confederation officials
Year of birth missing (living people)